The city of Buenos Aires is administratively divided into fifteen comunas, unlike the Province of Buenos Aires, which is subdivided into partidos, or the rest of Argentina, in which the second-order administrative division is departamentos. Each comuna encompasses one or more neighbourhoods (barrios), which are represented in the respective community centres for administrative purposes.

The division by comunas was instituted by the 1996 Constitution of the City of Buenos Aires, and modified in 2005 by Law #1777. The law was again modified in 2008, 2011, and 2013.

List of comunas
The comunas are serially numbered. They are listed below in numerical order together with their constituent neighbourhoods.

 Comuna 1: Puerto Madero, San Nicolás, Retiro, Monserrat, San Telmo and Constitución
 Comuna 2: Recoleta
 Comuna 3: Balvanera and San Cristóbal
 Comuna 4: La Boca, Barracas, Parque Patricios and Nueva Pompeya
 Comuna 5: Almagro and Boedo
 Comuna 6: Caballito
 Comuna 7: Flores and Parque Chacabuco
 Comuna 8: Villa Soldati, Villa Lugano and Villa Riachuelo
 Comuna 9: Parque Avellaneda, Mataderos and Liniers
 Comuna 10: Villa Luro, Vélez Sársfield, Floresta, Monte Castro, Villa Real and Versalles
 Comuna 11: Villa Devoto, Villa del Parque, Villa Santa Rita and Villa General Mitre
 Comuna 12: Villa Pueyrredón, Villa Urquiza, Coghlan and Saavedra
 Comuna 13: Núñez, Belgrano and Colegiales
 Comuna 14: Palermo
 Comuna 15: Villa Ortúzar, Chacarita, Villa Crespo, La Paternal, Agronomía and Parque Chas

See also
Departments of Argentina – second-level administrative divisions in other parts of Argentina.

References

External links